Marc Scott Ceccarelli (born January 4, 1968) is an American animator, director, producer, and writer. He won the 2018 British Academy Children's Awards in International Animation and the 2018 Daytime Emmy Award in Outstanding Children's Animated Series for his work on Nickelodeon's SpongeBob SquarePants.

Filmography

Television

Film

References

External links

American animated film directors
American animated film producers
American television directors
Television producers from California
SpongeBob SquarePants
1968 births
Animators from California
BAFTA winners (people)
Living people
People from Bakersfield, California
American storyboard artists